Roman Poltavets (born on 27 July 1983) is a retired Ukrainian professional footballer who played as a forward.

Honours
Mykolaiv
 Ukrainian Second League: 2010–11

Desna Chernihiv
 Ukrainian Second League: Runner Up 2011–12

Individual
 Desna Chernihiv Player of the Year: 2012

References

1983 births
Living people
Soviet footballers
FC Desna Chernihiv players
FC Cherkashchyna players
MFC Mykolaiv players
FC Vorskla Poltava players
FC Lviv players
SC Olkom Melitopol players
FC Feniks-Illichovets Kalinine players
FC Spartak Ivano-Frankivsk players
SC Tavriya Simferopol players
Association football forwards